Chad McMahan is an American businessman and politician, serving as a Republican member of the Mississippi State Senate for the 6th district, which includes parts of Itawamba and Lee counties.

Early life
Chad McMahan was born and educated at the Tupelo High School in Tupelo, Mississippi in 1990. He graduated from Union University in Jackson, Tennessee in 1995.

Career
McMahan worked for Great Southern Industries, a packaging company, for two decades.

McMahan was an alderman in Guntown, Mississippi. Since January 2016, he has served as a Republican member of the Mississippi State Senate, representing District 6, which includes most of Lee County and parts of Itawamba County, Mississippi.

Personal life
McMahan is married to Nicky Clayton, and they have a son. They reside in Guntown, and he attends the North Star Baptist Church in Saltillo, Mississippi.

References

Living people
People from Lee County, Mississippi
Union University alumni
Businesspeople from Mississippi
Republican Party Mississippi state senators
21st-century American politicians
1972 births